"If My Heart Had Windows" is a country song written by Dallas Frazier and recorded by George Jones in 1967 on his album of the same name. Released as a single that year, Jones's version peaked at number seven on the Billboard Hot Country Singles charts.

In 1968, crooner Andy Russell performed a cover version (Capitol #2072) that peaked at number 29 on the Billboard Adult Contemporary Singles Chart.

Ernest Tubb also recorded a version on his 1968 Decca release Country Hit Time.

Twenty-one years after the original version, Patty Loveless recorded a cover of the song on her 1987 album, also entitled If My Heart Had Windows. Loveless's version was also a top-10 country hit — the first of her career — peaking at number 10 on the country music charts.  It was also the song that she performed the evening that she was inducted into the membership of the Grand Ole Opry.

Chart positions

George Jones

Andy Russell

Patty Loveless

References 

1967 singles
1988 singles
George Jones songs
Patty Loveless songs
Songs written by Dallas Frazier
Song recordings produced by Tony Brown (record producer)
Song recordings produced by Emory Gordy Jr.
Country ballads
Musicor Records singles
MCA Records singles
1967 songs